Chlorosoman is a chlorine analog of soman. It is a highly toxic organophosphorus compound and used as the precursor substance for soman nerve agent. Its physical properties are estimated. Soman is insoluble in water, with a boiling point of 223 degrees Celsius and a melting point of -27 degrees Celsius. Chlorosoman is at least 2.5x less toxic than its analogue.

The ClG series of compounds is used more as a precursor to highly toxic compounds. For example, soman is a precursor to EA-2613 and EA-3209.

Synthesis 
ClGD follows the same synthetic route as soman, with fluoridation being omitted. Chlorosoman is prepared by the Finkelstein reaction between a solution of sodium chloride in DMF and soman.

References 

Nerve agent precursors
Pinacolyl esters